Christoph Reintjes is a German professional pool player. He is best well known for being the runner-up at the 2017 Dutch Open.

Career
Reintjes first competed in Euro Tour events in 2007, where he reached the last 32 in his first professional competition, at the 2007 German Open. He would play Tony Drago, but lose 9-10. He would enter three competitions this season, but would only make the knockout round on this occasion.

In 2008, he would once again reach the knockout rounds of Euro Tour events, at the Swiss and Austrian Opens, losing to Marcus Chamat 8–9, and Bruno Muratore 5–9. A year later, Reintjes went further at the 2009 French Open. He would defeat Imran Majid 9–8 in the last 32, before losing to Mark Gray 9–3 in the last 16.

Following 2009, Reintjes would take a sabbatical from pool, only playing in the 2011 Hungary Open before 2017. However, in 2017, he would play in the 2017 Leende Open. Reintjes would defeat Murat Teker 9–8, John Abiven 9–1, Tomasz Kapłan 9-8 and Nick van den Berg 9–3 to reach the knockout rounds.

In the last 32, Reintjes would defeat Jakub Koniar 9–6, before defeating former winner Wojciech Szewczyk 9–5 in the last 16. Reintjes then defeated Niels Feijen 9–6 in the quarterfinals, and Albin Ouschan 9–6 to reach the final of the event. In the final, he would play Russia's Ruslan Chinakhov, and despite having a 4–2 lead, eventually lost 4–9.

Titles
 2021 World Cup of Pool - with (Joshua Filler)
 2018 German Pool Championship 14.1 
 2017 German Pool Championship 9-Ball

References

External links

German pool players
Living people
Year of birth missing (living people)